Mamadou Diarra may refer to:

 Mamadou Diarra (basketball) (born 1986), Malian basketball player
 Mamadou Diarra (footballer, born 1970), Malian football striker
 Mamadou Diarra (footballer, born 1997), Senegalese football defender

See also
Mahamadou Diarra (born 1981), Malian international footballer
Mohamadou Diarra (born 1983), Senegalese rugby union player